Hush-a-bye or Hushabye may refer to:

"Hushabye", a song recorded by The Mystics 
Hushabye (album), by Hayley Westenra
"All the Pretty Little Horses", a lullaby also called "Hush-a-bye"
"Rock-a-bye Baby", a lullaby also called "Hush-a-bye"